Xiamen Golden Dragon Bus Co. Ltd 
(or commonly known as 金旅客车) is a Chinese joint venture company established in 1992 in developing, manufacturing, and selling 5m to 18m long luxury buses and light vans with the trade mark of "Golden Dragon". It has a reputation as one of the top 10 bus manufacturers and bus brands in China. Its buses have been exported to nearly 40 countries and regions in Asia, the Middle East, Africa, South America, and the company is tapping into the European market. It is part of King Long, one of the largest bus manufacturers in China.

Products

City buses

Golden Dragon XML6125CC 
Golden Dragon XML6125CLE
Golden Dragon XML6115
Golden Dragon XML6125
Golden Dragon XML6125CR 
Golden Dragon XML6125CL
Golden Dragon XML6155
Golden Dragon XML6180J
Golden Dragon XML6845
Golden Dragon XML6925J13CN

Coaches

XML6103 "Phoenix"
XML6122 "Triumph"
XML6126 "Superstar"
XML6129E5G "Grand Cruiser"
XML6852/XML6807J12/XML6857J12/XML6907J12/XML6957J13/XML6102 (Exclusive for PH Market) "Splendour"
XML6125J23 "Explorer"
XML6129J18 "Navigator"

Intercity buses
Golden Dragon XML6103J92
Golden Dragon XML6121E51G
Golden Dragon XML6127D52
Golden Dragon XML6127D53

Mini buses

Golden Dragon XML6700 (Licensed Toyota Coaster production), also produced as an electric bus by Nanjing Golden Dragon Bus as the NJL6706EV.
Golden Dragon XML6807
Golden Dragon XML6857

Special vehicles
Golden Dragon XML6723 School bus
Golden Dragon XML6901 School bus
Golden Dragon XML6700 Police bus
Golden Dragon XML6127 Police bus
Golden Dragon Police Command bus

SUVs
Golden Dragon Righto V3

Vans
Golden Dragon V3/ Golden Dragon XML6532 (Xiamen Golden Dragon Haice)
Golden Dragon V4
Golden Dragon X5 
Golden Dragon Z4

Coaches and City Buses (Philippine market)

In 2012, Golden Dragon Bus appointed a new distributor and assembler, Trans-Oriental Motor Builders, Inc., located in Naic, Cavite of the Philippines.
XML6127 "Marcopolo II"
Series I - uses headlamps for Golden Dragon XML6103 "Phoenix" on front and rear
Series II - uses headlamps for Golden Dragon XML6957 "Snow Fox" on front, XML6103/XML6127J6 on rear
Series III - uses headlamps for Golden Dragon XML6122 "Triumph" on front and rear
XML6127 "Marcopolo"
XML6103 "Marcopolo II"
Series I - uses headlamps for Golden Dragon XML6103 "Phoenix" on front and rear
Series II - uses headlamps for Golden Dragon XML6957 "Snow Fox" on front, XML6103/XML6127J6 on rear
Series III - uses headlamps for Golden Dragon XML6122 "Triumph" on front and rear
XML6102 "Splendour"
XML6125J28C "Chuanliu"
XML6129J18 "Navigator"

References

External links

Xiamen Golden Dragon Bus Co., Ltd.
Official Website in Chinese

Bus manufacturers of China
Vehicle manufacturing companies established in 1992
Manufacturing companies based in Xiamen
Chinese brands
Chinese companies established in 1992